The Somali Rebellion was the beginning of the civil war in Somalia that occurred in the 1980s and early 1990s. The rebellion started in 1978 when President Siad Barre began using his special forces, the "Red Berets" (Duub Cas), to attack clan-based dissident groups opposed to his regime. The dissidents had been becoming more powerful for nearly a decade following his abrupt switch of allegiance from the Soviet Union to the United States and the disastrous 1977-78 Ogaden War.

When Barre was injured in an automobile accident on May 23, 1986, rivals within his own government and from opposition groups became bolder and entered into open conflict. Siad Barre's flight from the capital, on January 26, 1991, marked a distinct shift in the conflict. From that date, fighting continued up until the April 1992 United Nations mission to Somalia, UNOSOM I, followed two years later by UNOSOM II. Barre's collective punishment referred to his clan-based violence against what he viewed as rival clan members during the anti-Barre Somali Rebellion. The most egregious forms of clan-based violence perpetrated by the Barre dictatorship were against the Isaaq and Majeerteen clans.

Crackdowns by the Barre administration

Against the Majeerteen
In the aftermath of the Ogaden War, a group of disgruntled army officers attempted a coup d'état against the regime in April 1978. Their leader was Colonel Mahammad Shaykh Usmaan, a member of the Majeerteen clan, which resides mostly in northeastern Somalia. The coup failed and seventeen alleged ringleaders, including Usmaan, were summarily executed. All but one of the executed were of the Majeerteen clan. One of the plotters, Lieutenant Colonel Abdullahi Yusuf Ahmed escaped to Ethiopia and founded an anti-Siad Barre organization initially called the Somali Salvation Front (SSF; later the Somali Salvation Democratic Front, SSDF).

One of Barre's earliest forms of collective punishment targeting non-combatant clans was against the Majeerteen in 1979. Between May and June 1979, his presidential Guard, called the Red Beret, killed over 2000 Majeerteen clan members. The Umar Mahmud sub-lineage of Majeerteen particularly became the victims of this violence. Although this violence was in response to the Majeerteen-based SSDF, Barre on the other hand began to target the entire clan. Each subsequent attack by the SSDF resulted in collective punishment against the wider Majeerteen. This included sieges and blockades against Majeerteen-inhabited areas, closure of schools, closure of health-facilities, and the destruction of subsistence facilities such as water reservoirs and cattle. Each action by the Barre government, strengthened Majeerteen resolve against his regime.

The Red Berets systematically smashed the small reservoirs in the area around Galcaio so as to deny water to the Umar Mahamuud Majeerteen sub-clans and their herds. In May and June 1979, more than 2,000 Umar Mahamuud, the Majeerteen sub-clan of Colonel Ahmad, died of thirst in the waterless area northeast of Galcaio, Garoowe, and Jerriiban. In Galcaio, members of the Victory Pioneers, the urban militia known for harassing civilians, raped large numbers of Majeerteen women. In addition, the clan lost an estimated 50,000 camels, 10,000 cattle, and 100,000 sheep and goats.

Against the Isaaq

In April 1981, a group of Isaaq businesspeople, students, former civil servants and former politicians who lived in the United Kingdom founded the Somali National Movement in London. Initially, the aim of the various groups that merged to create the SNM was not to create an armed liberation front, but rather these groups formed as a direct response to the harsh policies enacted by the Barre regime against the Isaaq people.

By 1982 the SNM transferred their headquarters to Dire Dawa in Ethiopia, as both Somalia and Ethiopia at the time offered safe havens of operation for resistance groups against each other. From there the SNM successfully launched a guerrilla war against the Barre regime through incursions and hit and run operations on army positions within Isaaq territories before returning to Ethiopia. The SNM continued this pattern of attacks from 1982 and throughout the 1980s, at a time the Ogaden Somalis (some of whom were recruited refugees) made up the bulk of Barre's armed forces accused of committing acts of genocide against the Isaaq people of the north.

A policy letter written by Barre's son-in-law and viceroy in the north General Mohammed Said Hersi Morgan known as The Morgan Report formed the basis of the Barre regime's retaliation against the Isaaq following a successful SNM attack on Hargeisa and Burao. The policy letter provided “implemented and recommended measures” for a “final solution” to Somalia's “Isaaq problem”.

According to Rebecca Richards, a systematic state violence that followed was linked to the Barre government's belief that SNM attacks were receiving assistance from the Ethiopian government. The harsh reprisals, widespread bombing and burning of villages by Barre regime followed every time there was an attack by SNM believed to be hiding in Ethiopia. The regime violence in the north and northwest was disproportionate, affected many communities, particularly Isaaq. The number of civilian deaths in this massacre is estimated to be between 50,000-100,000 according to various sources, whilst local reports estimate the total civilian deaths to be upwards of 200,000 Isaaq civilians. The government attack included the levelling and complete destruction of the second and third largest cities in Somalia, Hargeisa (which was 90 per cent destroyed) and Burao (70 per cent destroyed) respectively through a campaign of aerial bombardment, and had caused 400,000 Somalis (primarily of the Isaaq clan) to flee their land and cross the border to Hartasheikh in Ethiopia as refugees, creating the world's largest refugee camp then (1988), with another 400,000 being internally displaced.

A United Nations investigation concluded that the Barre regime's killing of Isaaq civilians was a genocide, and that the crime of genocide was "conceived, planned and perpetrated by the Somali government against the Isaaq people".

Against the Hawiye
The Hawiye moved quickly to occupy the south portion of Somalia. The capital of Mogadishu is located in the country of the Abgaal subclan of Hawiye. Since the independence era, the Hawiye tribe had occupied important administrative positions in the bureaucracy and in the top army command. However, in the late 1980s disaffection with the regime set in among the Hawiye, who felt increasingly marginalized by the Siad Barre regime.

Taisier M. Ali states that Barre assuaged the Majeerteen, and targeted other groups like the Hawiye. According to Ali, "with funds and clan appeals, he [Barre] was able to entice the bulk of SSDF fighters to return from Ethiopia and participate in his genocidal wars against the Isaaq in the north and later against the Hawiye in the South, including Mogadisho". According to Mohamed Haji Ingiriis, the vicious atrocities during the reign of Barre were not an isolated event nor unusual in Somalia's history. Barre also targeted the Hawiye.

Faced with saboteurs by day and sniper fire by night, Siad Barre ordered remaining units of the badly demoralized Red Berets to kill civilians on a large scale. By 1989 torture and killing became the order of the day in Mogadishu.

The Red Berets killed 450 Muslims demonstrating against the arrest of their spiritual leaders. More than 2,000 were seriously injured. The next day, forty-seven people, mainly from the Isaaq clan, were taken to Jasiira Beach west of the city and summarily executed. The July mass killings prompted a shift in United States policy as the United States began to distance itself from Siad Barre.

With the loss of United States support, the regime grew more desperate. An anti-Siad Barre demonstration on July 6, 1990, at a soccer match in the main stadium deteriorated into a riot, causing Siad Barre's bodyguard to panic and open fire on the demonstrators. At least sixty-five people were killed. A week later, while the city reeled from the impact of what came to be called the Stadia Corna Affair, Siad Barre sentenced to death 46 prominent members of the Manifesto Group, a body of 114 notables who had signed a petition in May calling for elections and improved human rights. During the show trial that resulted in the death sentences, demonstrators surrounded the court and activity in the city came to a virtual halt. On July 13, a shaken Siad Barre dropped the charges against the accused. As the city celebrated victory, Siad Barre, conceding defeat for the first time in twenty years, retreated into his bunker at the military barracks near the airport.

The most shocking and gruesome revenge Siad Barre took against the Hawiye, in particular the Hawadle (Xawadle) sub-clan was the massacre he ordered in January 1991, just before he escaped Mogadishu for his clan strongholds in the deep south of Somalia. It is estimated that over 6,000 individuals died in the massacre of Beledweyne, including women and children. This was a major turning point for the USC and further fueled the need to overthrow Siad Barre's regime - eventually proving successful as he was overthrown in late January. This incident in Beledweyne was the major cause for clan tensions as Siad Barre's militias mainly consisted of Marehan, Ogaden and Majeerteen militias, led by General Morgan (Majeerteen) - who had caused many civilian deaths towards Isaaq's (SNM) by sending bombers to attack the northern cities, including Hargeisa (Somalia's second largest city).

In response to mutinies by Hawiye soldiers in October 1989, the Red Berets began attacking Hawiye civilians. According to history professor Robert F. Baumann, this shift of antagonism towards to Hawiye was a major military blunder since Barre's stronghold happened to be in Mogadishu, whose environs are majority Hawiye. These actions by Barre sealed his fate, as by 1990 the predominantly Hawiye USC (United Somali Congress) military group had beset the capital of Mogadishu.

Against Ogaden
The bulk of Darood refugees who fled the Ethiopia-Somalia war were Ogaden. Barre's hostility towards the Ogaden was in part derived from the huge influx of their clan members in the aftermath of war with Ethiopia, which resulted in a swelling of their numbers. This surge in their population resulted in what he viewed as an undue influence, with a change in the balance of power away from his own Marehan clan towards the Ogaden clan. This resulted in Barre dismissing several military officers who were of Ogaden lineage. The friction escalated when Barre purged the minister of defense, Aden Gabiyo from office, who was of Ogaden lineage. In May 1989, this culminated into a revolt by Ogaden soldiers stationed in Kismaayo, the formation of an anti-Barre military faction formed of Ogaden clansmen called SPM (Somali Patriotic Movement) and the defection of Ogaden colonel Omar Jess.

Somaliland and Puntland
In 1991, the Somali National Movement declared the northwestern portion of the country independent. Although internationally recognised as an autonomous region of Somalia, Somaliland, as with neighboring Puntland, has remained relatively peaceful.

References

Further reading
The Fall of Siad Barre and the Descent into Civil War Nations Encyclopedia
Majeerteen Insurgency in Somalia 1978-1986  OnWar.com

1980s in Somalia
20th-century conflicts
Civil wars involving the states and peoples of Africa
Civil wars post-1945
Conflicts in 1986
Conflicts in 1987
Conflicts in 1988
Conflicts in 1989
Conflicts in 1990
Conflicts in 1991
Military history of Somalia
Revolutions of 1989